Minister of Finance is the person in charge of the Ministry of Finance of Paraguay.

Ministers

José de Elizalde, 1811-1814
Francisco Díaz de Bedoya, 1814-1819
José Gabriel Benítez, 1819-1827
Juan Manuel Álvarez, 1827-1844
Benito Varela, 1844-1850
Mariano González, 1850-1869
José Díaz de Bedoya, 1869-1870
Salvador Jovellanos, 1870
Juan Bautista Gill, 1870-1871
Pedro Recalde, 1871-1873
Francisco Soteras, 1873
Jaime Sosa Escalada, 1873-1874
Juan Bautista Gill, 1874
Emilio Gill, 1874-1875
Adolfo Saguier, 1875-1876
Cándido Bareiro, 1876-1878
Juan Antonio Jara, 1878-1882
Juan de la Cruz Giménez, 1882-1884
Agustín Cañete, 1885-1887
Higinio Uriarte, 1887-1889
José Tomás Sosa, 1889-1890
José Segundo Decoud, 1890-1891
Esteban Rojas, 1892
Otoniel Peña, 1892-1893
Agustín Cañete, 1894-1895
Tomás Benjamín Aceval Marín, 1895-1897
Agustín Cañete, 1897-1898
Guillermo de los Ríos, 1898
José Urdapilleta, 1898-1900
Francisco Campos, 1900
Fulgencio Ricardo Moreno, 1901-1904
Juan Bautista Gaona, 1904
Emiliano González Navero, 1904-1905
Manuel Barrios, 1905
Emiliano González Navero, 1905-1906
Carlos Luis Isasi, 1906
Adolfo R. Soler, 1906-1908
Gualberto Cardús Huerta, 1908-1910
Víctor M. Soler, 1910
José Antonio Ortiz, 1910-1911
Francisco L. Bareiro, 1911-1912
Higinio Arbo, 1912
Gerónimo Zubizarreta, 1912-1915
José P. Montero, 1915-1916
Eusebio Ayala, 1916
Luis Alberto Riart, 1916-1917
Francisco Sosa Gaona, 1917-1919
Eusebio Ayala, 1919
Pastor Ibáñez, 1919-1920
Manuel Peña, 1920
Eligio Ayala, 1920-1921
Eligio Ayala, 1921-1923
Luis Alberto Riart, 1923-1924
Eliseo Da Rosa, 1924
Manuel Benítez, 1924-1927
Rodolfo González, 1927-1928
Eligio Ayala, 1928-1930
Rodolfo González, 1930-1931
Justo Pastor Benítez, 1931
Luis Alberto Riart, 1931
Geronimo Zubizarreta, 1931
Justo Pastor Benitez, 1931
Rodolfo González, 1931-1932
Justo Pastor Benitez, 1932
Benjamín Banks, 1932-1936
Luis Freire Esteves, 1936
Alfredo Jacquet, 1936
Emilio Gardel, 1936-1937
Luis Frescura, 1937-1938
Enrique Bordenave, 1938-1939
Justo Pastor Benítez, 1939
Cipriano Codas, 1939-1940
Justo Pastor Benítez, 1940
Francisco Esculies, 1940
Rogelio Espinoza, 1940-1944
Juan Plate, 1944-1945
Horacio Chiriani, 1945
Alfonso E. Dos Santos, 1945-1946
Agustín Ávila, 1946
Juan Natalicio González, 1946-1948
Leandro Prieto, 1948-1949
Ramón Méndez Paiva, 1949-1952
Guillermo Enciso Velloso, 1952-1954
Antonio H. Saldívar, 1954
Carlos Velilla, 1954-1956
César Barrientos, 1956-1988
Carlos Antonio Ortiz Ramírez, 1988
Elvio Alonso Martino 1988-1989
Enzo Debernardi, 1989-1991
Juan José Díaz-Pérez, 1991-1993
Crispiano Sandoval, 1993-1994
Orlando Bareiro, 1994-1996
Raúl Cubas Grau, 1996
Carlos Facetti, 1996-1997
Miguel Ángel Maidana Zayas, 1997-1998
Gerardo Doll, 1998-1999
Federico Zayas, 1999-2000
Francisco Oviedo, 2000-2002
James Spalding, 2002
Alcides Giménez, 2002-2003
Dionisio Borda, 2003-2005
Ernest Bergen, 2005-2007
César Barreto, 2007-2008
Miguel Ángel Gómez, 2008
Dionisio Borda, 2008-2012
Manuel Ferreira Brusquetti, 2012-2013
Germán Rojas, 2013-2015
Santiago Peña, 2015-2017
Lea Giménez, 2017-2018
Benigno López, 2018-2020
Oscar Llamosas Díaz, 2020- 
Sources:

See also
 Government of Paraguay

References

Finance
Finance Ministers

1810s establishments in the United Provinces of the Rio de la Plata